Mehdikhan Mahalleh (also Romanized as Mehdīkhān Maḩalleh; also known as Karmalāt and Mehdī Maḩalleh) is a village in Masal Rural District, in the Central District of Masal County, Gilan Province, Iran. At the 2006 census, its population was 434, in 124 families.

References 

Populated places in Masal County